UnCruise Adventures (formerly American Safari Cruises) is an American-owned small ship adventure cruise line founded in Everett, Washington. In 2008, the then American Safari Cruises was purchased by the parent company InnerSea Discoveries Alaska Inc. In early 2013 after a fleet expansion, the American Safari Cruises was renamed to Un-Cruise Adventures. In 2016, the company rebranded itself UnCruise Adventures, while also unveiling a new logo. Currently the cruise line operates 9 ships, 8 of which are fully owned, and a majority sailing under the U.S. flag. The cruise liner operates two headquarters, the main headquarters is located in Seattle, Washington and the second located in Juneau, Alaska. It offers small group tours and expedition voyages in destinations ranging from Alaska to the Galápagos Islands.

History
UnCruise Adventures was founded as the American Safari Cruises in 1996 in order to provide small yacht cruises in Alaska. Following in 1997, the American Safari Cruise commenced operations with a charted yacht.

The company focuses on small vessels, with capacities ranging from 22 to 88. Their tours take guests on seven to twenty-one night trips to destinations such as Alaska, British Columbia, coastal Washington, Columbia and Snake Rivers, Mexico, Hawaii, Costa Rica and Panama. The focus is on nature.

UnCruise Adventures was listed on Conde Nast's "Best Cruise Ships in the World" 2021 list, and number 8 on USA Today's 2021 "Best Adventure Cruise Line" list.

Fleet

Current fleet

Wilderness fleet 
Wilderness Adventurer
Wilderness Discoverer
Wilderness Explorer

Safari fleet 

Safari Endeavour
Safari Voyager
Safari Explorer
Safari Quest
La Pinta

River Cruise fleet 
S.S. Legacy

See also
 List of cruise lines

References

External links

1996 establishments in Washington (state)
Companies based in Seattle
Transport companies established in 1996
Cruise lines
Tourism in Alaska
Water transportation in Alaska